Giorgio Marengo, I.M.C. (born 7 June 1974) is an Italian prelate of the Catholic Church. Created a cardinal by Pope Francis on 27 August 2022, he has been the Apostolic Prefect of Ulaanbaatar, a missionary jurisdiction that covers the entire country of Mongolia, since 2 April 2020. 

He is the youngest member of the College of Cardinals.

Biography
Marengo was born in Cuneo on 7 June 1974. He is part of the scouts, practices fencing and he graduated at a classical lyceum.

He studied philosophy from 1993 to 1995 at the Theological Faculty of Northern Italy and theology from 1996 to 1999 at the Pontifical Gregorian University. He studied at the Pontifical Urban University from 1999 to 2002, earning a licentiate and later on (2016) a doctorate in missiology. On 24 June 2000, he made his profession of vows for the Consolata Missionaries and on 26 May 2001 he was ordained a priest.

The first member (together with a confrere and 3 religious sisters) of his order to work in Mongolia, he has served there since becoming a priest.

From 2016 to 2020 he was his order's regional councilor of Asia, superior of the Consolata Missionaries for Mongolia and parish priest at Mary Mother of Mercy parish in Arvaikheer.

On 2 April 2020 Pope Francis appointed him apostolic prefect of Ulaanbaatar and titular bishop of Castra Severiana. He succeeded Wenceslao Selga Padilla, who died on 25 September 2018. He was consecrated in the Santuario della Consolata on 8 August 2020 by Cardinal Luis Antonio Tagle, assisting him were Archbishop Cesare Nosiglia, Archbishop of Turin and Cardinal Severino Poletto, Archbishop-emeritus of Turin.

When Pope Francis announced on 29 May 2022 that he planned to make Marengo a cardinal on 27 August, Marengo was in Rome to participate in a meeting he had arranged between the pope and Buddhist leaders from Mongolia. He said: "Dialogue with the Buddhist world, which is a majority in Mongolia, is fundamental for us, it is part of our mission. I am sure it will bear good fruit."

On 27 August 2022, Pope Francis made him a Cardinal-Priest, assigning him the title of San Giuda Taddeo Apostolo.

Publications 
 Sussurrare il Vangelo nella terra dell'eterno Cielo blu, riflessioni missiologiche sullevangelizzazione in Mongolia; Urbaniana University Press, Via Urbano VIII, 16 – 00165 Roma.

See also
 Cardinals created by Pope Francis

References

External links 

 
 
 

21st-century Italian Roman Catholic bishops
1974 births
Living people
People from Cuneo
Roman Catholic missionaries in Mongolia
Pontifical Gregorian University alumni
Pontifical Urban University alumni
Catholic exorcists
Italian exorcists
Cardinals created by Pope Francis